Hương Lan, real name Trần Thị Ngọc Ánh (Saigon, 1955) is a Vietnamese popular singer.

The eldest of five children, she moved to France in 1978 and has since been linked to artist Hữu Phước.

References

1956 births
Vietnamese emigrants to France
Living people
20th-century Vietnamese women singers